Chamaebatia, also known as mountain misery, is a genus of two species of aromatic evergreen shrubs endemic to California. Its English common name derives from early settlers' experience with the plant's dense tangle and sticky, strong-smelling resin. They are actinorhizal, non-legumes capable of nitrogen fixation through symbiosis with the actinobacterium, Frankia.

Taxonomy

Species
Chamaebatia comprises the following species:
 Chamaebatia australis (Brandegee) Abrams – Southern mountain misery
 Chamaebatia foliolosa Benth. – Sierra mountain misery, bearclover, kit-kit-dizze

Species names with uncertain taxonomic status
The status of the following species is unresolved:
 Chamaebatia foliolosa Newb.

References

External links
USDA Plants Profile
Jepson Manual Treatment

Dryadoideae
Rosaceae genera